Scotland has elections to several bodies: the Scottish Parliament, the United Kingdom Parliament, local councils and community councils. Before the United Kingdom left the European Union, Scotland elected members to the European Parliament.

Scottish Parliament
Scottish Parliamentary elections use the Additional Member System (AMS). Under this system, voters are given two votes: one for their constituency, which elects a single MSP by first-past-the-post; and one for their region, which elects seven MSPs by closed list. Five Scottish Parliamentary elections have been held since the reconvention of the Scottish Parliament in 1999. Elections are held every five years, on the first Thursday in May.

2021

2016

2011

2007

2003

1999

By-elections

2019 Shetland by-election, Lib Dem hold
2017 Ettrick, Roxburgh and Berwickshire by-election, Con hold
2014 Cowdenbeath by-election, Lab hold
2013 Dunfermline by-election, Lab gain from SNP
2013 Aberdeen Donside by-election, SNP hold
2006 Moray by-election, SNP hold
2005 Glasgow Cathcart by-election, Lab hold
2001 Banff and Buchan by-election ,SNP hold
2001 Strathkelvin and Bearsden by-election, Lab hold
2000 Glasgow Anniesland by-election, Lab hold
2000 Ayr by-election, Con gain from Lab

UK Parliament

2019

2017

2015 

At the 2015 election the SNP won a majority of Scottish seats for the first time.

2010 

* Philip Lardner, the Conservative candidate for North Ayrshire and Arran was disowned by the Conservative Party for comments he posted on his website, calling homosexuality 'abnormal'. It was too late for him to be replaced and he still read as the Scottish Conservative & Unionist Party candidate on the ballot paper.

2005

2001

1997

1992

1987

1983

1979

October 1974

February 1974

1970

1966

1964

1959

1955

1951

1950

1945

1935

1931

1929

1924

1923

1922

1918

1910 December

1910 January

1906

1900

1895

1892

1886

1885

1880

1874

1868

1865

1859

1857

1852

1847

1841

1837

1835

1832

1831

1830

Local councils
Since 1995, local elections in Scotland have been generally held every four years for all the 32 unitary authorities created under the Local Government etc. (Scotland) Act 1994. Between 1975 and 1992, elections were held every two years for either district or regional council, which sat for four-year terms. Those arrangements were set up by the Local Government (Scotland) Act 1973.

As one consequence of the Gould Report, which was a response to the fiasco of the 2007 elections, the next council elections were scheduled for 2012 (one year after the Parliamentary elections in 2011).

2022

2017
The elections were held again using the STV system of proportional representation, and as with the 2012 Scottish local elections, they were delayed for one year to ensure they were not held on the same day as the 2016 Scottish Parliament elections (which was delayed for a year, owing to the 2015 general election). For full analysis see 2017 Scottish local elections.

2012

The election was contested for the second time under the STV system of proportional representation. It was the first time in 13 years that the elections had not been held on the same day as the Scottish Parliament elections.

Past elections
 1977 Scottish local elections
 1980 Scottish local elections
 1982 Scottish regional elections
 1984 Scottish local elections
 1986 Scottish regional elections
 1988 Scottish local elections
 1990 Scottish regional elections
 1992 Scottish local elections
 1994 Scottish regional elections
 1995 Scottish local elections
 1999 Scottish local elections
 2003 Scottish local elections
 2007 Scottish local elections

By-elections

2008

date to be announced: Abbey (4-member ward), Dumfries and Galloway, 1 member elected by single transferable vote: result pending (result May 2007: 2 Con, 1 SNP, 1 Lab)
1 May: Troup (3-member ward), Aberdeenshire, 1 member elected by single transferable vote: result pending (result May 2007: 1 SNP, 1 Con, 1 Ind)
6 March: Cambuslang East (3-member ward), South Lanarkshire, 1 member elected by single transferable vote: Lab gain from SNP (result May 2007: 2 Lab, 1 SNP; after by election: 3 Lab)
28 Feb: Lerwick South (4-member ward), Shetland, 1 member elected by single transferable vote: Ind hold (result May 2007: 4 Ind; after by election: 4 Ind)
21 Feb: Highland (3-member ward), Perth and Kinross, 1 member elected by single transferable vote: SNP hold (result May 2007: 2 SNP, 1 Con; after by election: 2 SNP, 1 Con)
14 Feb: Elgin City South (3-member ward), Moray, 1 member elected by single transferable vote: SNP gain from Ind (result May 2007: 1 SNP, 1 Lab, 1 Ind; after by election: 2 SNP, 1 Lab)
31 January: Kilsyth (3-member ward), North Lanarkshire, 1 member elected by single transferable vote: Lab hold (result May 2007: 2 Lab, 1 SNP; after by election: 2 Lab, 1 SNP)

2007

22 November: Lochee (4-member ward), Dundee, 1 member elected by single transferable vote: SNP hold (result May 2007: 2 SNP, 2 Lab; after by election: 2 SNP, 2 Lab)
4 October: Helensburgh and Lomond South (3-member ward), Argyll and Bute, 1 member elected by single transferable vote: Lib Dem gain from Ind (result May 2007: 1 Con, 1 Ind, 1 Lib Dem; after by election: 2 Lib Dem, 1 Con)
16 August: Midstocket/Rosemount (3-member ward), Aberdeen, 1 member elected by single transferable vote: SNP gain from Con (result May 2007: 1 Con, 1 SNP, 1 Lab; after by election: 2 SNP, 1 Lab)

2006

8 December: Elderslie, Renfrewshire, Lab hold (16% swing Lab to SNP)
28 September: Markinch and Woodside East, Fife, SNP gain from Lab
10 August: Lochardil, Highland, Lib Dem gain from Ind
15 June: Dumbarton West, West Dunbartonshire, SNP gain from Lab
18 May: Altonhill Hillhead and Longpark, East Ayrshire, SNP hold
11 May: Biggar, Symington and Black Mount, South Lanarkshire, Con gain from SNP
30 March: Avondale South, South Lanarkshire, Con hold
30 March: Borestone, Stirling, SNP gain from Lab
30 March: King's Park, Glasgow, Lib Dem gain from Lab
16 February: Milton, Glasgow, SNP gain from Lab
2 February: North Carrick and Maybole East, South Ayrshire, Ind gain from Lab

2005

8 December: Kirkshaws, North Lanarkshire, Lab hold
10 November: Knightswood Park, Glasgow, Lab hold
10 November: Loanhead, Midlothian, SNP gain from Ind
10 November: Murrayfield, Edinburgh, Con hold
13 October: Lochside, Dumfries and Galloway, Lab gain from Ind
29 September: Auchtertool and Burntisland East, Fife, SNP gain from Ind
11 August: Herbertshire, Falkirk, SNP gain from Lab
16 June: Kildrum and Park, North Lanarkshire, SNP gain from Ind
9 June: Huntly East, Aberdeenshire, Con hold
9 June: Kilnknowe and Clovenfords, Borders, SNP gain from Ind
17 March: Dalkeith/Woodburn, Midlothian, Lib Dem gain from Lab
17 March: Dumbarton West, West Dunbartonshire, Lab hold

European Parliament
In 1999, a Scotland-wide constituency replaced eight first-past-the-post constituencies used in the elections between 1979 and 1994. This returned eight MEPs under the d'Hondt method of party-list proportional representation system. Since then the number of MEPs returned by Scotland has been reduced twice, to seven in 2004, and then to six in 2009.

Following the United Kingdom's exit from the European Union on 31 January 2020, Scotland no longer elects representatives to the European Parliament.

Elected candidates are shown in bold. Brackets indicate the number of votes per seat won.

2019

2014

2009

2004

1999

Pre-1999 elections
For full details of results please referee to related articles;

Glasgow
Highlands and Islands
Lothians
Mid Scotland and Fife
North East Scotland
South of Scotland
Strathclyde East
Strathclyde West

1994

1989

1984

1979

Referendums
To date eight referendums have been held in Scotland, covering a wide range of issues.

 1975 United Kingdom European Communities membership referendum
 1979 Scottish devolution referendum
 1994 Strathclyde water referendum
 1997 Scottish devolution referendum
 2005 Edinburgh congestion charge referendum
 2011 United Kingdom Alternative Vote referendum
 2014 Scottish independence referendum
 2016 United Kingdom European Union membership referendum

See also

 Politics of Scotland
 Electoral systems in Scotland
 Political parties in Scotland

References

External links 
Scotland – Electoral Commission
Boundary Commission for Scotland